The Roman Catholic Church in Latvia is composed of one ecclesiastical provinces with three suffragan dioceses.

List of Dioceses

Episcopal Conference of Latvia

Ecclesiastical Province of Riga
Archdiocese of Riga 
Diocese of Jelgava
Diocese of Liepāja
Diocese of Rēzekne-Aglona

External links
 http://www.catholic-hierarchy.org/country/lv.html

Latvia
Latvia religion-related lists